The "Maison du Peuple" in Clichy, classified as official historical monument of France (Monument Historique) since 1983, is a building built from 1935 to 1939 in the Parisian suburb of Clichy-la-Garenne by the architects Eugène Beaudouin, Marcel Lods, the engineer Vladimir Bodiansky and Jean Prouvé..

The Maison du Peuple of Clichy is both "an architectural jewel of the first immediate suburbs ", "a mechanical jewel " and "a perfect example of harmony between modernity and modernisation"

History  

In 1935, the mayor of Clichy, Charles Auffray, launched a competition for architects to cover the outdoor market in Rue de Lorraine. The architects Beaudouin and Lods, associated with the engineer Vladimir Bodianski, proposed an innovative project: they intended to put the space to maximum use and therefore planned to leave the market on the ground floor while adding a floor on top of it that could house offices and a multipurpose room with 1,000 seats. The room was meant to be multi-functional: it could be transformed into a cinema, in a fully modular build with partitions, a retractable floor and a retractable roof, in a marvel of ingenuity.

To achieve what Charles Auffray called the Maison du Peuple , the architects collaborated with Jean Prouvé. Prouvé provided original technical solutions, the most exemplary of which remains the curtain walls, used for the first time in Clichy: the walls are not load-bearing, but instead simply suspended from the structure. 

For its foundations, it seemed useful at that time to build a basement intended to serve, possibly, as an anti-aircraft shelter that still exists today. It is located on the boulevard du Général Leclerc side. It could accommodate around 200 people living in the area during the alerts.

The restoration of the building was undertaken in 1993 under the leadership of Hervé Baptiste.

References

Bibliography 

 Benedikt Huber, Jean-Claude Steinegger, "Jean Prouvé : une architecture l’industrie", Zurich, Éditions d’architecture Artemis, 1971
 Michel Ragon, "Histoire mondiale de l’architecture et de l’urbanisme modernes, tome 2, pratiques et méthodes, 1911-1971", Paris, Casterman, 1972, p. 103-105
 Kenneth Frampton, "Modern architecture, a critical history", Londres, Thames & Hudson, 1980
 William J.R. Curtis, "Modern Architecture since 1900", Paris, Éditions Phaidon, 1982, p. 376-377
 Jean-Louis Cohen, « Des bourses du travail au temps des loisirs. Les avatars de la sociabilité ouvrière », dans Collectif, Architecture pour le peuple. Maisons du Peuple. Belgique, Allemagne, Autriche, France, Grande Bretagne, Italie, Pays-Bas, Suisse, Bruxelles, Archives d’architecture moderne, 1984, p. 159-183
 Jean-Claude Bignon et Catherine Coley, "Jean Prouvé, entre artisanat et industrie", 1923-1939, École d’architecture de Nancy, 1990
 Gérard Monnier, "L’Architecture en France. Une histoire critique 1918-1950". Paris, 1990, pp. 177-178
 Peter Sulzer, "Jean Prouvé (1901-1984) — Meister der Metallumformung", in "Jean Prouvé. Meister der Metallumformung das neue blech", Köln, R. Muller, 1991, p. 21-27
 Bruno Reichlin, "L'infortune critique du fonctionnalisme", dans Les Années trente. L'architecture et les arts de l'espace entre industrie et nostalgie , Paris, 1997, p. 190-191
 Sous la direction d'Antoine Picon, "L'art de l'ingénieur, constructeur, entrepreneur, inventeur", p. 275-276, Éditions du Centre Georges Pompidou, Le Moniteur, Paris, 1997
 Claude Loupiac, Christine Mengin, "L’architecture moderne en France, 1889-1940", Paris, Éditions Picard, 1997, p.179
 Bernard Toulier, « La maison du Peuple à Clichy : premier exemple de mur rideau en panneaux préfabriqués. Restituer une machine architecturale aux multiples usages », Architecture et patrimoine du xxe siècle en France, Editions du Patrimoine, 1999, p. 284-287
 Peter Sulzer, "Jean Prouvé, Œuvre complète", Volume 2 : 1934-1944, Birkhäuser, Bâle, Suisse, 2000, couverture
 "Jean Prouvé, Constructeur 1901-1984", Ville de Nancy, RMN, 2001
 "Jean Prouvé et Paris", Pavillon de l’Arsenal, mai-août 2001
 Catherine Dumont d’Ayot, Bruno Reichlin (dir.), "Jean Prouvé, La poétique de l’objet technique", Vitra Design Museum, 2004 Kenneth Frampton, "L’architecture moderne, une histoire critique", Paris, Thames & Hudson, 2006 (1ère édition en langue anglaise en 1980), p. 223, p. 353
 Béatrice Simonot, "La maison du Peuple, Beaudouin, Lods, Prouvé, Bodiansky, un bijou mécanique", Monographik Éditions, Pavillon Vendôme / Ville de Clichy-La-Garenne, 2010
 Jean-Louis Cohen, "L’architecture au xxe siècle en France, Modernité et continuité", Paris, Hazan, 2014, p. 106
 Franz Graf, « La restauration de la Maison du Peuple à Clichy : un point de vue critique », dans Id., Histoire matérielle du bâti et projet de sauvegarde, Lausanne, Presses Polytechniques et universitaires romanes, 2014 (1reparution en anglais en 2008), p. 347-359
 Olivier Cinqualbre, "Jean Prouvé Bâtisseur", Collection Carnets d’architectes, Paris, Editions du patrimoine, 2016

Citations 

 Robert Mallet-Stevens, « L’éclairage et l’architecture moderne », Lux, n°1, janvier 1928, p. 6-9
 Beaux-Arts, 1939, no 345, p. 1 et 4
 "La maison du Peuple à Clichy", L'architecture d'aujourd'hui, mai 1939, no 5, p. 40-41
 « La maison du Peuple à Clichy », L’Ossature métallique, no 6, juin 1939
 « Constructions modernes », L’Encyclopédie de l’architecture, Tome XII, 1938, pl. 96 à 100
 « Maison du Peuple de Clichy », La Construction moderne, no 41, 17 septembre 1939
 « Le marché couvert de Clichy », La Technique des travaux, no 4, octobre 1939, p. 52
 « Marché et Maison du Peuple à Clichy », L’Architecture d’aujourd’hui, no 3-4, p. 50-55, 1940
 Marcel Lods, « De la paroi », L’Architecture française, Numéro spécial sur l’acier, no 44-45, juin-juillet 1944, p. 23-28
 « Marché de Clichy », L’Architecture d’aujourd’hui, no 4, janvier 1946
 « Soudure et techniques connexes », no 718, juillet-août 1950, p. 141-148
 « Maison du Peuple et marché couvert à Clichy. 1939 », Techniques et architecture, no 1, juin 1955
 "Maison de Clichy", Techniques et Architecture, novembre 1956
 "Maison de Clichy", Techniques et Architecture, février 1959
 Reyner Banham, « The Thin, bent detail », Architectural Review, Avril 1962, p. 249-252
 K.L.B., « Clichy market: a Pioneer Convertible Building », The architectural Review, vol. 143, n° 853, mars 1968, p. 233
 Manfred Schiedhelm, « Marcel Lods », Architectural Design, n°10, Vol. 44, 1974, p. 636-639
 Charlotte Ellis, « Prouvé’s peoples’ palace », The architectural review, n°1059, mai 1985, p.41-47
 Bruno Reichlin, « Maison du peuple in Clichy : ein Meisterwerk des “synthetischen” Funktionalismus ? », Daidalos, no 18, 15 décembre 1985, p. 88-99
 Bruno Reichlin, « Maison du peuple at Clichy, a masterpiece of “synthetic” functionalism? », Daidalos, n°18, 15 décembre 1985, p. 88-99
 Jean-Louis Cohen "Architectures du front populaire", Mouvement social, janvier-mars 1989, n°146, p. 49 à 59
 Hervé Baptiste, « La Maison du Peuple à Clichy, Hauts-de-Seine », Monumental, n° 2, mars 1993, p. 68-77
 François Robichon, "La Maison du Peuple à Clichy à la fin des années trente", L'architecture, n° 70, novembre 1996
 Hervé Baptiste, "Hauts-de-Seine. Clichy. Maison du Peuple" , Paris, DRAC Île-de-France, document de presse n° 2, sept. 1997
 Catherine Dumont d’Ayot, Franz Graf, « Espace-temps : l’oubli d’une fonction. La Maison du peuple de Lods, Beaudouin, Bodiansky et Prouvé à Clichy », Faces, La sauvegarde du moderne, n°42/43, automne-hiver 1997-98, p. 53-59
 Christian Enjoloras, « L'utile et le merveilleux », Monumental, 2000, p. 180
 « Béatrice Simonot raconte la Maison du Peuple », ClichyMag, Magazine de la ville, Clichy et les projets de transports en Île-de-France, n°185, janvier 2011
 Caroline Bauer (présenté par), « Entretien avec Jean Prouvé, Nancy, le 8 juin 1982, par Jean-Marie Helwig »,Jean Prouvé de l’atelier à l’enseignement, transmission d’une culture technique, Cahiers du LHAC, no 1, Nancy, Laboratoire d’Histoire de l’architecture contemporaine, 2014, p. 57-68
 Hervé Baptiste, "La Maison du Peuple...", in Monumental , 2000, p. 181-191

Exhibitions 

 1981, Paris, Centre Georges Pompidou, Paris-Paris ;

 1991, Paris, Centre Georges Pompidou, Marcel Lods 1891-1978. architects photographs ;
 1997, Paris, Pavillon de l’Arsenal, Paris sous verre. La ville et ses reflets ;
 1997, Paris, Musée des monuments français, Les Années 30. "L’Architecture et les arts de l’espace entre industrie et nostalgie".
 Leyla Beloucif, « Maison du Peuple, Clichy , Marcel Lods (1891-1978). Visions croisées sur l’homme et l’œuvre". Cité de l’architecture et du patrimoine, Expositions virtuelles, 2017 (voir ici).

Academic work 

 Ariela Katz, Maisons du Peuple: Modernity and Working Class Identity in French Architecture, 1919- 1940, PhD in history of architecture under the direction of Jean-Louis Cohen, Institute of Fine Arts, New York University, 2014.

Monuments historiques of Île-de-France